Battle of the Bulge is a 1965 American widescreen epic war film produced in Spain, directed by Ken Annakin, and starring Henry Fonda, Robert Shaw, Telly Savalas, Robert Ryan, Dana Andrews, and Charles Bronson. The feature was filmed in Ultra Panavision 70 and exhibited in 70 mm Cinerama.  Battle of the Bulge had its world premiere on December 16, 1965, the 21st anniversary of the titular battle, at the Pacific Cinerama Dome Theatre in Hollywood, California.

The film is a highly fictionalized account of the battle. The filmmakers attempted to condense the Ardennes Counteroffensive, a World War II battle that stretched across parts of Germany, Belgium and Luxembourg and lasted nearly a month, into under three hours, and shot parts of the film on terrain, and in weather, that did not remotely resemble the actual battle conditions. That left them open to criticism for lack of historical accuracy, but they claimed in the end credits that they had "re-organized" the chronological order of events to maximize the dramatic story.

Unlike most other World War II epics, Battle of the Bulge contains virtually no portrayals of actual senior Allied leaders, civilian or military. That is presumably because of controversies surrounding the battle, both during the war and afterward. Allied forces ultimately won the battle, but the initial German counteroffensive caught them by surprise and caused many casualties.

Plot
In December 1944, Military Intelligence officer Lt. Col. Daniel Kiley and his pilot, Joe, are flying a reconnaissance mission over the Ardennes forest that spans easternmost Belgium, northern Luxembourg, and parts of bordering France and Germany. They locate a German staff car and photograph its occupants, buzzing low enough for a close-up to cause its shell-shocked driver to flee the car without stopping its engine. His commanding officer scolds him for wasting petrol, extremely precious to the German war effort.

The officer, Col. Hessler, continues on to his new underground base, where General Kohler briefs him on the top secret plan to pierce American lines and recapture Antwerp. At the same time, English-speaking German paratroopers, led by Lt. Schumacher, are dropped behind American lines disguised as American MPs to confuse and disrupt the Allies. Hessler's orderly and driver, Conrad, remarks upon the staggering losses Germany has sustained during the war, pointing out to his superior that his new young tank commanders are not the men he had trained and led through the campaigns in Poland, France, and the Crimea. Upon a review of the Panzer commanders, all of whom are, as Conrad said, young and inexperienced, both men are skeptical until the commanders break into a chorus of Panzerlied, showing him their fighting spirit. Hessler is tentatively won over.

Meanwhile, Kiley returns to U.S. headquarters and warns once again that the Germans are planning a new offensive. His superiors, Maj. Gen. Grey and his executive officer, Col. Pritchard, do not listen, believing Germany lacks the resources and manpower to mount an attack, especially in winter, let alone with the Christmas holidays looming immediately ahead. Seeking proof, Kiley is sent to an outpost on the Siegfried Line to capture prisoners for interrogation. At the loose disciplined American base, Maj. Wolenski sends callow Lt. Weaver and gung-ho Sgt. Duquesne on patrol. They capture young, green German soldiers. Rather than proof of German desperation, Kiley believes they are keeping their more experienced men back for an offensive, but is again dismissed by his superiors as a "crackpot".

Hessler launches his attack the next day, leading columns of German King Tigers, the largest and most powerful tanks of World War II.  The main Allied tank, the Sherman, was less than half its weight and could not penetrate its armor in a head-to-head fight. Wolenski leads his men into the wooded area of the Schnee Eifel to fight back, but they are overrun. A group of Allied tanks, led by Sgt. Guffy, also attempts to slow the Panzers, but their tanks' weak guns and thin armor make them ineffective. On the trip back to Amblève, Guffy's crew moves black market goods from a nearby farmhouse. Lt. Schumacher and his disguised troops capture the only bridge over the Our River that can carry heavy tanks, and Hessler continues toward Amblève, secretly observed by Kiley. Guffy meets up with his Belgian girlfriend, Louise, and they split the proceeds of their racket. They also discuss their feelings for each other, implying they will marry when the war is over.

Schumacher later takes control of a vital intersection of three roads that connect Amblève, Malmedy, and the Siegfried Line. He sabotages the road signs, and the rear echelon of Wolenski's troops takes the wrong road to Malmedy. They are captured and massacred by SS troops, though a wounded Weaver escapes. Other US soldiers become suspicious when they observe Schumacher's "MPs" pretending to be demolishing the Our bridge, but laying the explosives incorrectly.

As the Americans have improvised a strong defense at Amblève, Kohler orders Hessler to bypass it, but Hessler wishes to break the Americans' will to fight, and Kohler relents. Grey assigns Wolenski to cover an Allied evacuation.  Hessler's tanks and infantry lay siege to Amblève, then occupy its ruins. Although many Americans, including Wolenski, are captured, senior staff safely escapes to the Meuse River to regroup for a counterattack. Guffy learns that Louise died in the shelling.

Despite the dangers of flying in fog and at night, Col. Kiley conducts an aerial reconnaissance. He and Joe find Hessler's tanks through a gap in the fog and radio in the coordinates. German fire causes the plane to crash near an American fuel depot, killing Joe and wounding Kiley.

In Hessler's command caravan, an exasperated Conrad confronts the Colonel, calls him a warmonger, and demands a transfer. Hessler transfers him to the fuel battalion.

Meanwhile, Grey's division, the Meuse at their backs, prepare to fight off Hessler's determined effort to capture the fuel depot.  In a headlong tank confrontation the Americans employ a gambit to lure the Germans into using up the last of their fuel. The American tanks are savaged, but the strategy works. Weaver, Guffy and a few soldiers kill off Schumacher and his disguised MPs before the arrival of Hessler's tanks. A wounded Kiley then staggers out of hiding and urges the men to burn the depot. Desperate, Hessler makes a last ditch effort to capture the depot. In defense, the Americans flood the road leading to it with gasoline and set it alight with grenades, immolating the German tanks and their crews. Hessler's tank takes a fuel drum rolled directly at it, incinerating him. General Grey arrives in time to see the panzers afire.

With no alternative, the surviving German soldiers abandon their vehicles and begin a long walk back to Germany. Conrad, bringing up the rear, throws aside his weapons, done with the war.

Cast

Historical inaccuracies 
The film's opening narration by William Conrad inaccurately states "to the north, stood Montgomery's Eighth Army...."  In fact, the British Eighth Army, Montgomery's previous command, was in Italy at the time; Montgomery's northern command was the 21st Army Group.  The narration continued, "...To the south, Patton's Third Army."  Although Patton's Third Army was indeed to the south it was not tasked in any way with defending the Ardennes.  Instead, it was dug in on the west bank of the Rhine River, a component of a much larger force of four American armies of the 12th Army Group under General Omar Bradley poised to cross it into Germany.

After the introduction there is no reference to British forces in the area, though they were largely kept behind the Meuse River and thus almost entirely out of the fighting. Consequently, there is no mention of General Eisenhower's decision to split the Bulge front into two, transferring temporary command of two American armies to Field Marshal Montgomery in the northern half of the Bulge.  As a result, the film implies an all-American operation.

The film was shot on location in the Sierra de Guadarrama mountain range and Madrid, Spain, which bear no resemblance to the rugged, heavily wooded Ardennes of Belgium, Luxembourg, and western Germany. Aside from the initial American encounters with the German offensive the weather during filming was also at odds with the actual battle, which was fought during waves of heavy snow.  The film's major tank battle scene, and some battle scenes, were fought in flat, bare, arid territory.

The aviation reconnaissance scenes with Henry Fonda were filmed with one or more Cessna L-19 aircraft, which did not fly until December 1949, instead of the Piper L-4 that was widely used during World War II.

The final tank battle is a rough depiction of the Battle of Celles on December 26, 1944, where the U.S. 2nd Armored Div. smashed the German 2nd Panzer Division. The film creates the false impression that large numbers of American tanks sacrificed themselves against heavy Tiger IIs and, in the process, lured the enemy off course, which caused them to run out of gas. In reality, they were already stranded. The tanks that were used, despite the claims of the producer in an interview in one of the DVD extras, are not historically accurate. Although the M24 Chaffee light tanks used in the movie in lieu of the ubiquitous M4 Sherman were introduced during World War II-, they were not used in the scale shown in the film but were relatively rare.

U.S. M47 Pattons were used to represent German King Tiger tanks (of which none existed to use), in spite of being over 20 tons lighter.

Absent from the movie is the response of the U.S. Third Army under General George Patton in relief of the bypassed but encircled city of Bastogne.

There is also no mention of the key turning point in the battle, which was not an armor and infantry effort but Allied air power hitting the German spearhead hard at the first sign of clear weather, only the German HQ receiving word that the weather was set to clear.

The characters of Kiley, an American lieutenant colonel, and Hessler, a regular Wehrmacht tank commander, were loosely based on Colonel Benjamin Abbott "Monk" Dickson and Waffen-SS lieutenant colonel Joachim Peiper. However, the fictional characters bore marked differences. For example, Peiper did not die in a kamikaze tank attack. He was tried and sentenced to death at the War Crimes Tribunal for his role in the Malmedy massacre, but released after serving twelve years in prison.  He lived until 1976, when he was murdered in France by French vigilantes.

Production 
Screenwriter Bernard Gordon claims to have rewritten John Melson's original screenplay. Some of the original choices for director were the experienced and successful Richard Fleischer, who turned it down, and Edward Dmytryk, with whom Jack L. Warner of Warner Bros. refused to work. Ultimately, the job went to Ken Annakin. The technical advisor on the film was Maj. Gen. (then Col.) Meinrad von Lauchert, who commanded the German tank division that made the most headway in the actual battle.

For an economical price and with no restrictions, the Spanish army provided an estimated 500 fully-equipped soldiers and 75 tanks and vehicles, some of which were World War II vintage.

A contentious matter in 1964-65 was another "Bulge" film—never completed—slated by Columbia Pictures, to have been called "The 16th of December: The Battle of the Bulge" and co-produced by Tony Lazzarino. The Columbia effort had the cooperation of the Pentagon, which offered to Lazzarino "an unpublished battle history running to thousands of pages," and Eisenhower's assistance as well. The film would have been shot largely in upper New York State at the Army's Fort Drum, which would have offered authentic winter weather conditions. The proposed Columbia film had the cooperation of many officers who were part of the battle, including Germany's General Hasso von Manteuffel (commander of the Fifth Panzer Army) and U.S. General Robert W. Hasbrouck (who had led Seventh Armored Division).

As late as December 1965—the month the Warner film was released—there were still plans to make the Columbia film. Casting announcements included Van Heflin as Eisenhower, John Wayne as General Patton, David Niven as General Montgomery, and Laurence Olivier as Hitler. Columbia issued a 1964 injunction against Warner's for registering its "Battle of the Bulge" title with the MPAA; to get Columbia to drop it, Warners agreed not to mention such actual names as Eisenhower, Montgomery, Bradley, Patton, MacAuliffe (the U.S. general who issued the dumbfounding "Nuts!" response to the German request for surrender), and ten others "whose stories have been contributed to the Morgan-Lazzarino version." Early in 1964, the press had announced a $1 million award to Columbia from the Warner production, also forbidden from "seeking support from agencies and individuals with whom Columbia Pictures and Gotham Rhodes had already made agreements."

Release

Home media 
The original VHS release of the film for home video use was heavily edited to fit on one VHS tape and used a full-screen "pan and scan" technique, which is often used in network telecasts of widescreen motion pictures. The 1992 Laserdisc and 2005 DVD releases feature the full-length film and are presented letterboxed in the original 2.76:1 aspect ratio. A Blu-ray release followed in 2007, also in the original 2.76:1 aspect ratio.

Reception

Box office

The film was one of the most popular films at the British box office in 1966.

Critical response
The film received mixed reviews from critics. Reviewers were impressed by the big-name cast, but they were unafraid to point out historical inaccuracies, as Bosley Crowther raged in his assessment of the film for The New York Times:

Eisenhower came out of retirement and held a press conference to denounce the film for what he considered its gross historical inaccuracy.

On review aggregator website Rotten Tomatoes, the film has a 63% approval rating based on 8 reviews, with an average score of 7.1/10.

Other media
 There was a Dell Movie Classic comic book tie-in in June 1966 titled Battle of the Bulge.
 There was a paperback novelisation written by Michael Tabor titled Battle of the Bulge (POPULAR; PC1062 edition; January 1, 1965)

See also
 List of American films of 1965

References

External links

 
 
 
 
 Spanish locations
 Marcus Wendel (May 14, 2006), "Heer Units". Viewed December 26, 2006.

1965 films
1965 war films
American World War II films
American war epic films
1960s English-language films
Films about armoured warfare
Films adapted into comics
Films directed by Ken Annakin
Films produced by Dino De Laurentiis
Films scored by Benjamin Frankel
Films set in 1944
Films set in 1945
Films set in Belgium
Films shot in Madrid
Warner Bros. films
Western Front of World War II films
World War II films based on actual events
Ardennes in fiction
Battle of the Bulge
1960s American films